Celebrity Big Brother 2016 may refer to:

Celebrity Big Brother 17
Celebrity Big Brother 18